Su Li (born 3 May 1985) is a Chinese sport shooter.

She participated at the 2018 ISSF World Shooting Championships, winning a medal.

References

External links

Living people
1985 births
Chinese female sport shooters
Running target shooters
Asian Games medalists in shooting
Shooters at the 2010 Asian Games
Shooters at the 2014 Asian Games
Asian Games gold medalists for China
Asian Games silver medalists for China
Medalists at the 2010 Asian Games
Medalists at the 2014 Asian Games
21st-century Chinese women